The 2022 Stock Car Pro Series was the forty-fourth season of the Brazilian car racing series previously called Stock Car Brasil. It marked the return of Corrida de Duplas and the first race in an airport in stock car history. The season started on February 13 and ended on December 11 with the Super Final BRB, both at Interlagos Circuit.

Calendar

Teams and drivers

Team changes 

The field expanded from 32 to 34 cars. Both Crown Racing and RKL Competições added one more car.

Blau Motorsport/TMG Racing and A.Mattheis Vogel Motorsport replace their previous Cruze model with a Toyota Corolla.

After dropping out of the 2021 championship at mid-season, MX Piquet Sports did not return. After taking command of the team last season, Scuderia CJ still at the championship.

Driver Changes 

Nelson Piquet Jr. moved to TMG Racing to replace Christian Hahn, having raced some events with his own team in 2021. After his debut in 2021, Hahn did not return this season.

2021 GT4 Endurance Brasil champion Andre Moraes Junior made his debut with Hot Car New Generation at selected events replacing Tuca Antoniazi due to personal commitments.

Rodrigo Baptista made his debut in the series with Crown Racing replacing Beto Monteiro who moved to Scuderia CJ.

2021 Stock Light champion Felipe Baptista made his debut with KTF Sports. Pedro Cardoso, who competed with Stock Light last season moved to Crown Racing.

Matias Rossi left Full Time Sports to replace Guga Lima at A. Mattheis Vogel Motorsport. He was replaced by Gianluca Petecof who competed in selected events.

Mid-season changes 

Due a conflict with Turismo Carretera first round, Matias Rossi will not compete at Corrida de Duplas. He was not replaced and returned from second round.

RKL Competições started the season with only one car, initially the team was planned with two cars after the expand of the field. At second round Renato Braga, that competed as wildcard at first round entered on second car. Thiago Vivaquca debuted in the series replacing Gustavo Frigotto at third round.

Andre Moraes Jr. replaced Tuca Antoniazzi at second round.

Results and standings

Results summary

Championship standings
Points system
Points are awarded for each race at an event to the driver/s of a car that completed at least 75% of the race distance and was running at the completion of the race. Before the last round, the four worst results are discarded. The second race of each event is held with partially reversed top ten grid.

Drivers' Championship

 5ª Corrida de Duplas 2022 was held in two races, with the first race only with the championship entries and the second only to the wildcard drivers. The grid of wildcard race was defined by the top 10 reverse grid of first race. The final position of wildcard race worth points for the championship entries only. Gabriel Casagrande and Gabriel Robe who earned the most points were declared the winners.

Manufacturers' championship
Only points scored by the qualifying and the top two drivers of a manufacturer in races count for the manufacturers' championship.
{| class="sortable"
|valign="top"|

Notes

Broadcasting

References

External links 
  

Stock Car Brasil seasons
Stock Car Brasil
Stock Car Pro Series